Labuan Airport  is an airport that serves the federal territory of Labuan in Malaysia. It was planned for Labuan Airport to be a regional hub for connecting flights within the Association of Southeast Asian Nations (ASEAN) but this plan was postponed due to logistics and unsuitability.

At present, this airport is being expanded to accommodate larger aircraft such as the Boeing 747 and the Airbus A330, with 4 aerobridges. In 2008, the airport handled 550,859 passengers, 11,328 aircraft movements and over 4,500 metric tonnes of cargo. The airport is able to handle over 1.2 million passengers per year.

Airlines and destinations

Passenger

Cargo

Traffic and statistics

Traffic

Statistics

Labuan Airbase
The Labuan Airport also located near with RMAF Labuan airbase.

See also

 Indonesia–Malaysia confrontation
 Far East Air Force (Royal Air Force)
 List of former Royal Air Force stations

References

External links

 Labuan Airport, Federal Territory at Malaysia Airports Holdings Berhad
 
 

Airports in Malaysia
Buildings and structures in Labuan
Transport in Labuan